

Danny "The Dude" Lasoski  (born February 3, 1959) is an American sprint car racing driver from Dover, Missouri.

Sprint car racing
Most of Lasoski's sprint car experience is in the World of Outlaws series, winning the WoO championship in 2001, and finishing second four times, in 1999, 2002, 2003, and 2004. He won the premiere event in sprint car racing, the Knoxville Nationals, in 1998, 2001, 2003 and 2004. Lasoski also won the 360 Nationals in 1995. He raced in the National Sprint Tour in 2006, winning the series' only championship. He rejoined the World of Outlaws after the season, and the NST folded. He has won 122 World of Outlaw feature events and was one of the more popular drivers on the tour.

In January 2014 Lasoski teamed up with Andy Cobb to compete in multiple national tours to include the World of Outlaws.

Lasoski joined forces in 2015 with car owner Tod Quiring and crew chief Guy Forbrook to win the inaugural National Sprint League (NSL) Championship. Lasoski has also won 11 Knoxville Raceway track championships (1986, 1989, 1990, 1992, 1993, 1994, 1996, 2008, 2011, 2015, 2016). He has won more races than any other driver with 112 career wins as of June 24, 2017, in the 410 division at Knoxville Raceway. He also has 37 career wins with the All Star Circuit of Champions.

Lasoski has driven for some of the top sprint car teams in the sport including Tod Quiring, Dennis Roth, Tony Stewart, and Casey Luna.

Lasoski is the uncle to professional sprint car racer Brian Brown.

IROC
Lasoski was invited to the International Race of Champions four times, from 2002 until 2004.
He missed the final race in 2002 at the Indianapolis Motor Speedway due to injuries sustained in a qualifying crash, with fellow dirt track racer Ken Schrader filling in. Lasoski won one race, in 2004 at the Texas Motor Speedway.

Lasoski also raced in the Canadian IROC series picking up three wins, all of them at the Canadian Motor Speedway.

Awards
He was inducted in the National Sprint Car Hall of Fame in 2011.

Motorsports career results

International Race of Champions
(key) (Bold – Pole position. * – Most laps led.)

References

External links
 

Living people
1959 births
People from Lafayette County, Missouri
Racing drivers from Missouri
World of Outlaws drivers
International Race of Champions drivers